Stanko Svitlica (Serbian Cyrillic: Станко Свитлица; born 17 May 1976) is a Serbian former professional footballer who played as a forward. He is best remembered for his time at Legia Warsaw, becoming the Polish Ekstraklasa top scorer in the 2002–03 season with 24 goals.

Career
A journeyman, Svitlica played for several clubs in FR Yugoslavia, as well as France and Greece, before Dragan Okuka brought him to Legia Warsaw in the summer of 2001. He scored ten goals from 28 appearances in all competitions during his debut season in Poland, helping the club win the national championship that year. In the following season, Svitlica netted 29 goals in 38 games (24 in 29 in the league), becoming the first foreigner ever to win the Golden Boot in the Polish Ekstraklasa. He continued his goalscoring form in late 2003, securing him a transfer to Hannover 96 in the 2004 winter transfer window. Despite an impressive start (Svitlica scored against Bayern Munich beating Oliver Kahn on his debut after coming off the bench), his career in the Bundesliga never really took off and Hannover offloaded him after just half a year. He spent the following two seasons with LR Ahlen in the second tier of German football, before returning to Poland and joining Wisła Kraków. However, Svitlica struggled for fitness and after just two games left the club. He later returned to Serbia and his former club Čukarički, but failed to make an impact. In 2010, Svitlica retired from professional football.

Honours
Partizan
 First League of FR Yugoslavia: 1995–96

Legia Warsaw
 Ekstraklasa: 2001–02
 Ekstraklasa Cup: 2002

Individual
 Ekstraklasa top scorer: 2002–03

References

External links
 
 
 
 

Living people
1976 births
Serbs of Bosnia and Herzegovina
Serbian footballers
Serbia and Montenegro footballers
Association football forwards
First League of Serbia and Montenegro players
Serbian First League players
Serbian SuperLiga players
Ligue 2 players
Super League Greece players
Ekstraklasa players
Bundesliga players
2. Bundesliga players
FK Partizan players
FK Čukarički players
Le Mans FC players
FK Proleter Zrenjanin players
FK Spartak Subotica players
Ethnikos Asteras F.C. players
Legia Warsaw players
Hannover 96 players
Rot Weiss Ahlen players
Wisła Kraków players
FK Srem players
FK Banat Zrenjanin players
Serbian expatriate footballers
Serbia and Montenegro expatriate footballers
Serbia and Montenegro expatriate sportspeople in France
Expatriate footballers in France
Serbia and Montenegro expatriate sportspeople in Greece
Expatriate footballers in Greece
Serbian expatriate sportspeople in Poland
Expatriate footballers in Poland
Serbia and Montenegro expatriate sportspeople in Germany
Expatriate footballers in Germany